Luke Kreamalmeyer (born September 28, 1982 in Edwardsville, Illinois) is a professional American soccer player.

Career

College and amateur
Kreamalmeyer attended Edwardsville High School where he scored a hat trick in the final state championship soccer game. Kreamalmeyer scored a record high 38 goals his senior season at Edwardsville and added 13 assists. Kreamalmeyer was voted First-team All American during his senior season at Edwardsville. Luke recorded 74 total goals at Edwardsville. He then played college soccer at Bradley University from 2001 to 2004. Luke made the MVC-All Freshman team in 2001. Kreamalmeyer was named first team All-Missouri Valley Conference as a junior and senior, and finished his career with 26 goals and 20 assists for the Braves. He also played for Chicago Fire Premier in the USL Premier Development League.

Professional
Upon graduating from Bradley, Kreamalmeyer was named the MVP at the MLS player combine in 2005. Due to his small stature, he fell in the 2005 MLS SuperDraft, until Real Salt Lake took him with the 37th overall pick. Kreamalmeyer played in six games as a rookie and was released after the season (added one assist).  Kreamalmeyer then played in 2006 for the Portland Timbers of USL First Division and led the team with 9 goals. Kreamalmeyer was also named USL-1 All-League First-team in 2006 and was the MVP of the Timbers team. Kreamalmeyer also played for the Timbers in 2007, but missed half the season due to an injury. He had 4 assists and one goal during half of the season.

In 2008 Kreamalmeyer played for the Rochester Rhinos. He tied for the Rhinos 2008 team lead in scoring with 17 points on 4 goals and 9 assists. In January 2009, he signed with the Carolina RailHawks. Kreamalmeyer added 4 goals and two assists on 22 starts before joining AC St Louis. In his first season with AC St Louis, Kreamalmeyer tied Mike Ambersley for the team lead in points with 18. He scored 5 goals and had 8 assists on the season. Kreamalmeyer's 8 assists tied Martin Nash for the assist lead in NASL during the 2010 season. Kreamalmeyer has played 150 professional games concluding the 2010 season with 25 goals and 24 assists in his career.

Kreamalmeyer signed a one-year contract with Montreal Impact of the North American Soccer League on February 17, 2011. He was released by Montreal on October 12, 2011.

Career stats

References

External links
 AC St. Louis bio
 Carolina RailHawks bio
 Rochester Rhinos bio
 MLS player profile

1982 births
Living people
AC St. Louis players
American soccer players
Bradley Braves men's soccer players
North Carolina FC players
Chicago Fire U-23 players
Expatriate soccer players in Canada
Montreal Impact (1992–2011) players
North American Soccer League players
People from Edwardsville, Illinois
Portland Timbers (2001–2010) players
Real Salt Lake players
Rochester New York FC players
St. Louis Strikers players
USL League Two players
USL First Division players
USSF Division 2 Professional League players
Soccer players from Illinois
Real Salt Lake draft picks
Major League Soccer players
Association football midfielders